Linsley is a surname. Notable people with the name include:

Corey Linsley (born 1991), American NFL football player
Earle Gorton Linsley (1910-2000), American entomologist
Haydn Linsley (born 1993), member of the New Zealand boyband Titanium
John Linsley (1925–2002), American physicist

Other uses
Linsley Peninsula, roughly rectangular ice-covered peninsula which protrudes into the south part of Murphy Inlet, northern Thurston Island, Antarctica
3474 Linsley, main-belt asteroid discovered in 1962 by Goethe Link Observatory at Brooklyn, Indiana

See also
Lindsley, a surname